Having It All may refer to:

 Having It All (musical), a 2011 American musical
 Having It All (radio programme), a 2007 radio drama series

See also
 Have It All (disambiguation)